Geoffrey Butler may refer to:

 Geoffrey Butler (swimmer) (born 1995), freestyle swimmer from the Cayman Islands
 Sir Geoffrey G. Butler, British historian and politician
 Geoffrey Butler (The Fresh Prince of Bel-Air), a character on the TV series The Fresh Prince of Bel-Air